Gregory is an unincorporated community located in Currituck County, North Carolina, United States. Gregory had a post office until the 1970s, when the Gregory post office was consolidated with the Shawboro post office. Gregory is mainly located along State Road 1148.

References

Unincorporated communities in Currituck County, North Carolina
Unincorporated communities in North Carolina